"Softly, as I Leave You" is a popular Italian song, originally titled Piano, composed by Tony De Vita with Italian lyrics by Giorgio Calabrese, and English lyrics by Hal Shaper.

Background
It was originally an Italian success by Mina, entitled "Piano" ("Softly"). Mina published a recording of the song first as a single in 1960 and later as well on an EP and on three LPs.  English songwriter Hal Shaper noticed the song and in November 1961 wrote English lyrics to the melody, calling it "Softly, as I Leave You."

When he performed the song live in Las Vegas, Elvis Presley prefaced with a story about the origins of the song. Presley said the song originated when a man was dying and his wife was sitting by his bedside. As she began to doze off, he felt himself beginning to die and he wrote the words to the song on a notepad. However, Presley insiders claim that his explanation for the song was merely an example of Presley's flair for storytelling, so his explanation is most likely apocryphal. Presley said he heard the story "from some people in Florida." Elvis doesn't actually sing this song; he speaks the words while his backing tenor Sherrill Nielsen sings it. Presley's one recorded version of this song was a bootleg made by a fan in the Las Vegas Hilton show on 13 December 1975. RCA was able to release it commercially in March 1978 and it now appears on the boxed set Walk A Mile In My Shoes: The Essential 70's Masters.

Cover versions

Matt Monro (1962) Parlophone 45 R 4868, whose single peaked at #10 in UK Singles Chart  Also include on the 1965 album, Hits Of Yesterday
Andy Williams (1964)
Bobby Darin (1965)
The Boston Pops Orchestra under the direction of John Williams on their 1993 album Night and Day: John Williams and the Boston Pops Celebrate Sinatra.
Cliff Richard with the London Philharmonic Orchestra on Richard's 1983 live album Dressed for the Occasion.
David Whitfield did a cover of the song on New Zealand TV (1973).
Doris Day (1963)
Elvis Presley a version recorded live by a fan in Las Vegas in 1975 was released posthumously as a single by RCA in 1978. 
In 1967, Eydie Gormé hit the US Easy Listening chart with her version.
Frank Sinatra on his 1964 album Softly, as I Leave You.  This version went to No. 27 on the Billboard Hot 100 and No. 4 on the Easy Listening chart in 1964). The Sinatra family announced Frank's death on May 14, 1998, by placing an announcement on their website that was accompanied by a recording of the singer's version of the song.
The Fleetwoods on their 1964 album Before And After.
John Gary released a version on his 1967 album John Gary at Carnegie Hall.
The Lettermen on their 1964 album She Cried
Robert Goulet (1964)
Shirley Bassey for her 1968 album This is My Life
The Sandpipers on their 1967 album The Sandpipers  
We Five on their 1965 album You Were on My Mind
Lena Horne on her 1965 album Feelin' Good
Johnny Rivers on his 1966 album Changes (which also features his version of "Poor Side of Town")
Vic Damone on his 1982 album Over the Rainbow
Howard Keel on his 1984 album And I Love You So
Shirley Horn on her 1987 album Softly
Michael Bublé as the B-side to "Feeling Good" in 2004
Ramon "RJ" Jacinto on his 2014 instrumental album Fine as Wine Instrumentals
Mirusia on her 2017 album "From the Heart"
Patti LaBelle 2017 album "Bel Hommage"

References

1960 songs
1962 singles
1964 singles
Frank Sinatra songs
Andy Williams songs
Bobby Darin songs
Matt Monro songs
Cliff Richard songs
Doris Day songs
The Fleetwoods songs
The Lettermen songs
Shirley Bassey songs
We Five songs
Vic Damone songs
Songs written by Hal Shaper
Songs written by Giorgio Calabrese